Adixi Lenzivio (born on 29 September 1992) is an Indonesian professional footballer who plays as a goalkeeper for Liga 2 club PSMS Medan. He is the son of Persija player in the 1980s Adityo Darmadi.

Club career

Persija Jakarta
Adixi gained the confidence to escort Persija's squad while clashing with Persisam Samarinda at the Gelora Bung Karno Stadium, Senayan, Jakarta, 6 January 2013. He also paid the trust to the latest performances. He successfully withstood the onslaught of Persisam players. Although ultimately Ferdinand Sinaga tore his goal through a free kick.

Futsal career 
He took a break from professional football in 2016 to study in a university, majoring in economics and made a switch to futsal. He played for Antam FC and FC Pegasus Sambas in Indonesia Pro Futsal League.

Professional Football Return 
While playing for FC Pegasus, he was called up to Indonesia national futsal team selection in 2019, and briefly after he was offered to come back to Persija. The team loaned out Daryono to Badak Lampung F.C. and he was needed to back Andritany Ardhiyasa and Shahar Ginanjar up. He accepted the offer and rejoined Persija, with giving up his futsal career.

He played for the first time for Persija since 2015 in a 2021–22 Liga 1 match against Persipura Jayapura on 18 September 2021.

Career statistics

Club

Notes

Honours

Club

Persija Jakarta
Menpora Cup: 2021

References

External links
 Adixi Lenzivio at Soccerway
 Adixi Lenzivio at Liga Indonesia

Living people
1992 births
Association football goalkeepers
Indonesian footballers
Liga 1 (Indonesia) players
Liga 2 (Indonesia) players
Persija Jakarta players
PSMS Medan players
People from Bekasi
Indonesian men's futsal players
Sportspeople from West Java